James Neil Hamilton (born January 18, 1957) is a Canadian former professional ice hockey player who played 95 games in the National Hockey League. He played with the Pittsburgh Penguins. As a youth, he played in the 1969 and 1970 Quebec International Pee-Wee Hockey Tournaments with a minor ice hockey team from Barrie.

Career statistics

References

External links

1957 births
Living people
Canadian ice hockey right wingers
Ice hockey people from Simcoe County
Pittsburgh Penguins draft picks
Pittsburgh Penguins players
Sportspeople from Barrie
Winnipeg Jets (WHA) draft picks